Orest Atamanchuk is a Ukrainian retired footballer.

Career
Orest Atamanchuk, started his career in 1995 at Khutrovyk Tysmenytsia. In summer 1997 he moved to Desna Chernihiv, the main club in the city of Chernihiv, then he moved to Slavutych-ChAES. In 1998 he moved to Kryvbas Kryvyi Rih, Kryvbas-2 Kryvyi Rih and in 1999 he played for Prykarpattia Ivano-Frankivsk and Prykarpattia-2 Ivano-Frankivsk. In 2001 he played again for Kryvbas Kryvyi Rih and in 2003 he played 19 matches scoring 3 goals with Spartak Ivano-Frankivsk. I  2004 he played 10 matches with Krymteplytsia Molodizhne, the club in Crimea and 48 matches and scoring 11 goals with Kryvbas Kryvyi Rih.

Honours
Krymteplytsia Molodizhne
 Ukrainian Second League: 2004–05

References

External links 
 Orest Atamanchuk footballfacts.ru
 Orest Atamanchuk allplayers.in.ua

1971 births
Living people
FC Desna Chernihiv players
FC Khutrovyk Tysmenytsia players
FC Slavutych players
FC Kryvbas-2 Kryvyi Rih players
FC Prykarpattia-2 Ivano-Frankivsk players
FC Krymteplytsia Molodizhne players
FC Spartak Ivano-Frankivsk players
Ukrainian footballers
Ukrainian Premier League players
Ukrainian First League players
Ukrainian Second League players
Association football midfielders